Asahigawa Dam is a dam on Asahi River straddling the border between Kibichūō and northern Takebe, Okayama in Okayama Prefecture, Japan. The dam was completed in 1954.

References 

Dams in Okayama Prefecture
Dams completed in 1954